John Huntingdon may refer to:

John Huntingdon (preacher)
John Huntingdon (MP) for Stafford (UK Parliament constituency)
John of Scotland, Earl of Huntingdon
John Holand, Earl of Huntingdon